Ernesto Maguengue (born 2 August 1964) is a Mozambican Roman Catholic prelate, who is the Auxiliary Bishop of Nampula. He was ordained as a priest on 14 May 1989 in Maputo. On 24 June 2004 he was appointed Bishop of Pemba, which came into effect on 14 November, until his resignation on 27 October 2012. On 6 August 2014 Maguengue was appointed Auxiliary Bishop of Nampula and Titular Bishop of Furnos Minor.

References

External links

21st-century Roman Catholic bishops in Mozambique
1964 births
Living people
People from Gaza Province
Place of birth missing (living people)
Roman Catholic bishops of Pemba
Roman Catholic bishops of Nampula
Roman Catholic titular bishops
Mozambican Roman Catholic bishops